Darcy Walsh (21 August 1918 – 27 November 1962) was a former Australian rules footballer who played with Melbourne in the Victorian Football League (VFL).

Notes

External links 

1918 births
1962 deaths
Australian rules footballers from Victoria (Australia)
Melbourne Football Club players
Brighton Football Club players